Perrin-Whitt High School is a Public High School located in Perrin, Texas. It is part of the Perrin-Whitt Consolidated Independent School District. The mascot is a pirate. School colors are navy blue & gold.
 UIL Boys Basketball State Finalist 1946(B)

External links
 
  https://www.uiltexas.org/basketball/state-bracket/1945-1946-b-boys-basketball-state-results

Perrin-Whitt Consolidated Independent School District
Public high schools in Texas
Schools in Jack County, Texas